Rostin Behnam  is an American lawyer and government official who currently serves as Chairman of the Commodity Futures Trading Commission.

Early career 
Behnam worked as a proprietary equities trader in New York City before earning his Juris Doctor degree at Syracuse University. After graduation, he worked for the New Jersey Bureau of Securities, then practiced law in New York City.

Government service 
Behnam was senior counsel to Democratic Senator Debbie Stabenow. In August 2017, he was nominated as a commissioner of the Commodity Futures Trading Commission by President Donald Trump.

On January 21, 2021, Behnam assumed the role of Acting Chairman following President Joe Biden's inauguration. His term expired on April 13, 2021. He was re-nominated for a new term through June 19, 2026, and was confirmed on December 15, 2021. President Biden nominated him as permanent chairman and he was confirmed by the Senate the same day. At the time of his appointment, Behnam was expected to increase regulation of the Wall Street derivatives market.

Stance on cryptocurrency and FTX 
In October 2022, Behnam said he was "impressed" by cryptocurrency exchange FTX's application to allow its U.S. operation, FTX.US, to clear customers’ margin-backed derivatives trades without intermediaries.

Personal life 
Behnam was raised in New Jersey. He currently lives in Baltimore with his wife and three children.

References

21st-century American lawyers
Biden administration personnel
Commodity Futures Trading Commission personnel
Georgetown University alumni
Living people
New Jersey Democrats
Syracuse University College of Law alumni
Trump administration personnel
Year of birth missing (living people)